"Too Good to Be True" is a song co-written and recorded by American country music artist Michael Peterson.  It was released in January 1998 as the third single from his debut album Michael Peterson. The song reached #8 on the Billboard Hot Country Singles & Tracks chart in May 1998.  The song was written by Peterson and Gene Pistilli.

Critical reception
Larry Flick, of Billboard magazine reviewed the song favorably, saying that the tune "boasts a percolating rhythm and Peterson's personality-packed vocals."

Music video
The music video was directed by Steven Goldmann and premiered in early 1998.

Chart performance
"Too Good to Be True" debuted at number 55 on the U.S. Billboard Hot Country Singles & Tracks for the week of January 31, 1998.

Year-end charts

References

1998 singles
1997 songs
Michael Peterson (singer) songs
Songs written by Michael Peterson (singer)
Song recordings produced by Josh Leo
Reprise Records singles
Music videos directed by Steven Goldmann